Mark Noyce (born 3 March 1974) is an English actor, writer, film director and producer.

Early life
Noyce was born in Peterborough, Cambridgeshire, the son of May Doreen (Bayford) and William Charles Albert Noyce. He attended Fulbridge infants and junior schools and received his secondary education at Walton Community School before moving on to Peterborough Regional College.

Martial arts career
Noyce first started training in the Lau Gar style of Kung-Fu at the age of 6 after his father had seen Enter the Dragon starring Bruce Lee. He appeared on the competitive scene in the early 1980s and retired at the age of 24 as world forms champion. He was quoted as saying, "I knew I’d peaked and was really struggling to motivate myself so it was definitely the right thing to do."

Partial martial arts accomplishments
International Chinese Kung Fu World forms champion
WUMA World forms champion
World classic forms champion
World Kickboxing Association British champion
Martial arts illustrated competitor of the year
MAI series forms champion
FSK (freestyle sport karate) forms champion
Ricochet forms champion
Martial arts illustrated forms competitor of the year

Noyce has been awarded a black belt in kung fu, karate, tang soo do and Mugendo kickboxing.

Product endorsements
Noyce has appeared in a series of events promoting Tracks2000 gym equipment after working closely with the development team. He helped design equipment which would aid martial artists wanting to learn acrobatics.

Film career
Noyce began his career working on numerous shorts and feature films often in small or supporting artist roles. Some of these include Nativity, Pimp, Killer Bitch, I against I and The Landlord.

He made his directorial debut with the comedy On the Ropes in 2011, he also wrote the script and played the lead role of Keith Kraft.

Several critics were complimentary about his acting and directing. In reference to his lead role, Mark Boosey, The British Comedy Guide editor, wrote, "This monstrous egocentric 'plonker' carries many of the film's best lines and set pieces, and is played very well by the film's creator, Mark Noyce". Britflicks critic Zachary Cooke said "films that are starring, written and directed by the same person are usually a no no, with on the Ropes this is not the case". Richard Cross of A Full Tank of Gas stated, "On the Ropes is one of those films that succeeds in spite of the nature of the British film industry and its financing rather than because of it, and Noyce is to be congratulated simply for getting the film made. That he also provides the audience with a high quality of comic entertainment is an unexpected bonus".

During a 2012 interview Shaun Williamson stated "I'm working with Mark Noyce on a film called This Is Jayde: The One Hit Wonder" and that he was "appearing as a twisted Simon Cowell version of myself. Should be fun!" A video was later released announcing further information about the film's plot and characters.

Britflicks and The British Comedy Guide reported in August 2014 that Noyce had begun production on the comedy thriller The Blazing Cannons.

In June 2017 Noyce was directing the drama A Dish Served Cold, starring Steven Arnold and Shaun Williamson.

In 2017 Happy Pup Films announced that Noyce was working with Tim Selberg and Selberg Studio's on the horror feature Sammy. Producer and director, Noyce contacted the studio after seeing their work in Dead Silence and Goosebumps.

Happy Pup Films
Noyce formed his film and television production company, Happy Pup Films, first producing the comedy film On the Ropes. The company is located in London.

Personal life
In June 2000, Noyce married Nicola Jayne Crawford, whom he met in 1994 while performing at a martial arts competition in Britain.

Filmography

Film

Television and theatre

References

External links
 
Newspaper article
 The Judy Theobald show
Magazine cover
 Irish Film and Television Network
 Filming This is Jayde article in The Citizen 

1974 births
English male film actors
English martial artists
Living people
English male television actors
English directors
People educated at The Voyager School
People educated at Peterborough Regional College